Yard Crashers is a television show on the DIY Network that surprises home owners with a brand-new yard. The show is hosted by Matt Blashaw who is a licensed contractor.
Like other "crasher" shows on the DIY Network, Blashaw and his crew ambush homeowners while they are home improvement shopping, follow them back to their homes, tear apart their yards and help them do a complete backyard makeover. They do the complete renovation in two filming days.
The previous host, Ahmed Hassan (2008–2011), was replaced by Matt Blashaw in 2011.  Blashaw is also taking a hiatus from the show, hosting HGTV's Vacation House For Free, starting summer 2014. Chris Lambton will temporarily host Yard Crashers.

See also
 Bath Crashers
 Candice Tells All
 Divine Design
 Fixer Upper
 Flip or Flop
 Income Property
 Love It or List It
 Property Brothers
 Take This House and Sell It

References

External links
 DIY Network Page
 
 Matt Blashaw Bio
 Ahmed Hassan Bio

Home renovation television series
2008 American television series debuts
DIY Network original programming